FXE may refer to:
Ferromex, a Mexican railway company
Fluorexetamine, an arycyclohexylamine research chemical
Fort Lauderdale Executive Airport, in Florida, United States
Fortunair, a Canadian airline